George Feilding, 1st Earl of Desmond (c. 1614 – 31 January 1665) was an English aristocrat, awarded the title of Earl of Desmond in the Peerage of Ireland by Charles I  of England under the terms of a letter patent issued by James I of England.

George Feilding was the second son of William Feilding, 1st Earl of Denbigh, and his wife, the former Susan Villiers. Susan was the sister of George Villiers, 1st Duke of Buckingham, confidant and lover of James I, and her family were showered with titles and preferment as a result of George Villiers' immense influence.

In 1622, when George Feilding was around 8 years old, James I created him Baron Fielding, of Lecaghe in the County of Tipperary, and Viscount Callan, of Callan in the County of Kilkenny. At the same time, George was given the right to the title Earl of Desmond as and when the previous holder of that title, Richard Preston, died without a male heir. Preston had also been a favourite and probably a lover of James I; he had a daughter who, the plan was, George Feilding would marry, but this did not happen. In 1628 Preston died and George inherited the title.

All three titles were in the Peerage of Ireland. Earl of Desmond is an ancient Irish title, the 1622 creation was its 4th, and current, creation.

George married Bridget Stanhope, who was the daughter of Sir Michael Stanhope and  Elizabeth Read and a sister-in-law of George Berkeley, 8th Baron Berkeley.

The couple had several children:

Lady Frances Feilding (died 1680), who married Sir Edward Gage, 1st Baronet, as his third wife
Lady Mary Feilding (died 1691), who married Sir Charles Gawdy, 1st Baronet
Lady Bridget Feilding (died 1669), who married Arthur Parsons
William Feilding, 2nd Earl of Desmond, later 3rd Earl of Denbigh
Hon. George Feilding, who married a daughter of Sir John Lee
Colonel Hon. Sir Charles Feilding (1641–1722), who married Ursula Stockton, daughter of Sir Thomas Stockton and Ursula Bellot, and widow of Sir William Aston, (both Stockton and Aston were High Court judges in Ireland) and had two daughters 
Rev. Hon. John Feilding (1641–1697), who married Bridget Cokayne and had children, including John, secretary to the Governor of Jamaica
Hon. Basil Feilding (died May 1667), killed in a quarrel by his brother Christopher
Hon. Christopher Feilding, sentenced to death in July 1667 for killing his brother Basil in a drunken quarrel."No one pitied him" was the terse verdict of Samuel Pepys.

References

|-

1665 deaths
1614 births
George
Members of the Irish House of Lords
Earls of Desmond (1628 creation)
Peers of Ireland created by Charles I
Younger sons of earls